Junglefowl are the only four living species of bird from the genus Gallus in the bird order Galliformes, and occur in parts of South and Southeast Asia. They diverged from their common ancestor about 4–6 million years ago.

Although originating in Asia, remains of junglefowl bones have also been found in regions of Chile, which date back to 1321–1407 CE, providing evidence of possible Polynesian migration through the Pacific Ocean.

These are large birds, with colourful plumage in males, but are nevertheless difficult to see in the dense vegetation they inhabit.

As with many birds in the pheasant family, the male takes no part in the incubation of the egg or rearing of the precocial young. These duties are performed by the drab and well-camouflaged female. Females and males do not form pair bonds; instead, the species has a polygynandrous mating system in which each female will usually mate with several males. Aggressive social hierarchies exist among both females and males, from which the term "pecking order" originates.

The junglefowl are omnivorous, eating a variety of leaves, plant matter, invertebrates such as slugs and insects, and occasionally small mice and frogs.

One of the species in this genus, the red junglefowl, is of historical importance as the ancestor of the chicken, the only domesticated species. Although the grey junglefowl, Sri Lankan junglefowl and green junglefowl  are likely to have also been involved.

The Sri Lankan junglefowl is the national bird of Sri Lanka.

Taxonomy
The genus Gallus was erected by the French scientist Mathurin Jacques Brisson in his Ornithologie published in 1760. The type species is the red junglefowl (Gallus gallus). The Swedish naturalist Carl Linnaeus had introduced the genus Gallus in the 6th edition of his Systema Naturae published in 1748, but Linnaeus dropped the genus in the important tenth edition of 1758 and put the red junglefowl together with the common pheasant in the genus Phasianus. However, the red junglefowl and common pheasant are now known to have diverged about 18–23 million years ago, and belong to different subfamilies. This pairwise divergence time was also the same between the other three junglefowls and the pheasant. As the publication date of Linnaeus's sixth edition was before the 1758 starting point of the International Commission on Zoological Nomenclature, Brisson and not Linnaeus is considered as the authority for the genus.

More recent phylogenetic evidence supports the closest relatives of Gallus being the bamboo partridges in the genus Bambusicola, from which they diverged about 15 million years ago.

Extant species
The genus contains four species.

Fossils
Prehistorically, the genus Gallus was found all over Eurasia; in fact, it appears to have evolved in southeastern Europe. Several fossil species have been described, but their distinctness is not firmly established in all cases:
 Gallus aesculapii (Late Miocene/Early Pliocene of Greece) - possibly belongs into Pavo
 Gallus moldovicus (Late Pliocene of Moldavia) - sometimes misspelt moldavicus, may be synonym of Pavo bravardi
 Gallus beremendensis (Late Pliocene/Early Pleistocene of Eastern Europe)
 Giant junglefowl Gallus karabachensis (Early Pleistocene of Nagorno-Karabakh)
 Gallus tamanensis (Early Pleistocene? of Taman Peninsula)
 Gallus kudarensis (Early/Middle Pleistocene of Kudaro, South Ossetia)
 Gallus europaeus (Middle Pleistocene of Italy)
 Gallus sp. (Middle/Late Pleistocene of Trinka Cave, Moldavia)
 Gallus imereticus (Late Pleistocene of Gvardjilas-Klde, Imeretia)
 Gallus meschtscheriensis (Late Pleistocene of Soungir, Russia)
 Gallus georgicus (Late Pleistocene - Early Holocene of Georgia)
 Gallus sp. (Late Pleistocene of Krivtcha Cave, Ukraine)
 Gallus sp. (Early Holocene of Dnieper region)

References

External links 
 

 
Extant Miocene first appearances
Taxa named by Mathurin Jacques Brisson